Kara Killmer (born June 14, 1988) is an American actress, best known for  starring as paramedic Sylvie Brett in the NBC drama series Chicago Fire (as well as the associated series Chicago Med and Chicago P.D., which together make up the One Chicago franchise), since 2014. Prior to that she starred in the short-lived 2010 Hulu original reality web series If I Can Dream.

Early life and education
Killmer was born in Crowley, Texas. She attended Baylor University in Waco, Texas, and graduated in 2010 with a Bachelor of Fine Arts in performing arts.

Career
Killmer starred in the short-lived Hulu original reality web series If I Can Dream in 2010, which featured five aspiring actors and actresses who were trying to make it in the entertainment business by living together in a Los Angeles home, fitted with cameras following their every move, “The goal is to get a job that will allow us to get out of the house and to move on to a bigger career. This is just the first step.”

In 2014, Killmer was cast as Athena True in the NBC science fiction crime thriller pilot Tin Man, but it was not picked up by the network when it announced its 2014–15 television schedule.  That same year, Killmer joined the cast of the NBC drama Chicago Fire as Sylvie Brett, the paramedic who replaces Leslie Shay (Lauren German) in the third season premiere titled "Always" that aired on September 23, 2014. She was featured on the cover of Chicago Splash magazine's August 2016 issue with Chicago Fire co-stars Monica Raymund and Miranda Rae Mayo.

Killmer made her feature film debut with her future husband Andrew Cheney and John Rhys-Davies in the Revolutionary War action-adventure thriller Beyond the Mask that was released on April 6, 2015.

Personal life
On May 14, 2016, Killmer married her Beyond the Mask co-star Andrew Cheney, whom she met on August 27, 2012 on the set of the film.

Filmography

Film

Television

References

External links
 
 
 
 

1988 births
21st-century American actresses
Actresses from Texas
American television actresses
Baylor University alumni
Living people
People from Crowley, Texas